The Armenian Ski Federation, also known as the Armenian Ski Association, is the regulating body of skiing and snowboarding in Armenia, governed by the Armenian Olympic Committee. The headquarters of the federation is located in Yerevan.

History
The Federation was established in 1992 and the current president is Gagik Sargsyan. The Federation is a full member of the International Ski Federation and the Small Evolving Ski Nations.

Activities
The Armenian skiing team participates in various international skiing competitions, including the FIS Alpine World Ski Championships.

In 2018, the European Union supported the development of a cross-country skiing festival in Armenia. The aim was to promote winter sports tourism and offer skiing masterclasses by professional trainers.

See also
 Armenian Biathlon Federation
 List of ski areas and resorts in Europe
 Sport in Armenia
 Tsaghkadzor ski resort

References

External links 
 Armenian Ski Federation on Facebook

Sports governing bodies in Armenia
Alpine skiing in Armenia
Skiing in Armenia
National members of the International Ski Federation